Dubiella is a genus of skippers in the family Hesperiidae.

Species
Recognised species in the genus Dubiella include:
 Dubiella comitana Freeman, 1969
 Dubiella dubius (Stoll, 1781)
 Dubiella fiscella (Hewitson, 1877)

References

Natural History Museum Lepidoptera genus database

Hesperiinae
Hesperiidae genera